Maine School Administrative District 9 (MSAD 9) is a regional school district in Franklin County, Maine. It serves children in grades K-12 with one high school (Mount Blue High School), one middle school and four elementary schools from Wilton, Farmington, Weld, Temple, Chesterville, New Vineyard, Industry, New Sharon, Starks, and Vienna. MSAD 9 recently become RSU 9.

References

External links
 

09
09
09